Professor Petros Kokkalis (18.9.1896 - 15.1.1962), a distinguished professor of Medicine in the University of Athens has been one of the leading figures of Medicine in pre WWII Greece, introducing pioneering methods in thoracic surgery and neurosurgery. His main medical achievements include the introduction of  thoracoplasty in Greece and removal of the phrenic nerve for the treatment of tuberculosis, as well as the first pneumonectomy with the Tourniquet method and the first pericardiectomy for the release of compressive pericarditis.

Biography
Kokkalis was born in Livadeia, Greece, the second child of Socrates Dim. Kokkalis (1856 – 1944), the philologist-headmaster from Arahova, and of Polyxeni Nakou (1866 – 1937). He married in 1938 to Niki Kouletsi (1913-1997) and had two children, Socrates (1939) and Avgi-Polyxeni (1944-2015).

Kokkalis registered at the Medical School of the University of Athens in 1911 but after 1913 he continued his studies at the Medical School of the University of Berlin on a Greek State Scholarship. He continued his Medical studies in Zurich and Bern as the assistant of E. Sauerbruch and Nobel laureate Theodor Kocher respectively and received his of Doctorate of Medicine in 1919. Afterwards he worked as assistant of Professor Fritz de Quervain in Berne, and E. F. Sauerbruch in Munich, until March 1928, while completing his Residence and advanced practice in Surgery.

He returned to Greece in 1929 to begin his academic career as Lecturer of Medicine in the University of Athens where he became in 1935 full Professor of Operative and Topographic Anatomy. He undertook the management of the 3rd University Surgical Clinic at “Evangelismos” Hospital and in 1939, he was elected at the 2nd Chair of the Surgical Clinic and at the same time he undertook the management of the 2nd University Surgical Clinic at “Aretaieio” hospital. Petros Kokkalis was the leading author of the two-volume collective textbook “Surgery” (1934), known as “Surgery of the Eight”, where he and Zannis Kairis had the redaction of the text co-authored by eight Athens Medical Professors.

With the outbreak of the Greek-Italian War in 1940, he served in the Albanian frontline as the Chief Medical Advisor and Surgeon of the Hellenic Army in Epirus until the collapse of the front and the German invasion in 1941. During the German occupation, due to his refusal to cooperate with the Nazi occupation forces he was expelled from the University, he was persecuted by the Nazis and the Greek collaborators and eventually fled Athens to join the National Resistance movement in the ranks of National Liberation Front (Greece) EAM in 1944.

In the first reshuffle of the Political Committee of National Liberation (PEEA), on April 19, 1944, due to his distinguished status as academic and intellectual, Petros Kokkalis was appointed Secretary of Social Welfare and Education and during that period he became member of the Greek Communist Party. Due to his political involvement during the resistance movement with the Greek Communist Party he was banned from the University of Athens after the liberation of Greece in 1945, and eventually departed from Athens to join the side of the left Provisional Democratic Government in 1947 as Secretary of Health and Social Welfare during the Greek Civil War 1947-49. Following the defeat of the left movement in August 1949, he immigrated through various countries in Eastern Europe and started his involvement with the International Peace Movements.

He resumed his medical research activities after April 1955 until his death on January 15, 1962, when he was offered a position by the Government of the DDR in Berlin. In 1955 he became Director of the Institute of Experimental Surgery of the Circulatory System of the German Academy of Sciences  (Arbeitsstelle für experimentelle Kreislaufchirurgie), which in 1960 is renamed to Institute of Experimental Cardiac and Vascular Surgery (Arbeitsstelle für experimentelle Herz-und Gefäßchirurgie) housed at Municipal Hospital “Friedrichshain”. On July 3, 1957, Petros Kokkalis was appointed Professor at the Medical School of Humboldt University, with a teaching assignment in the field of Surgery.

The highest achievement in his scientific work was the experiments in heart and lung transplants, a work he began in Berlin and further developed in cooperation with the Russian physiologist and experimental scientist Vladimir Demikhov (1916-1998), laying the foundations for the methodologies later used by South African Surgeon Christian Barnard in the first human heart transplant in 1967.

During his life Petros Kokkalis enjoyed close relationships with Greek intellectuals, politicians and artists like Nikos Kazantzakis (1883 - 1957), Takis Hatzis (1913 - 1981), Melpo Axioti (1905–1973), Georgios Papandreou (1888-1968), Panagiotis Kanellopoulos (1902-1986), Dimitrios Papaspyrou (1902-1987), George Bouzianis (1885-1959), as well as with his worldwide friends, such as  Rudolf Nissen (1896 -1981), Berthold Brecht (1898 - 1956), Helene Weigel (1900 -1971), Carola Nehr (1900-1942), Αnna Seghers (1900 - 1983),  Arnold Zweig (1887 - 1968), Nazim Hikmet (1902 - 1963) etc.

On Monday, January 15, 1962, Petros Kokkalis died in Berlin. His body was transferred to Greece, according to his wishes, where he was buried on January 29, 1962, with personal permission by his old acquaintance then Prime Minister Konstantinos Karamanlis.

References

1896 births
1962 deaths
Greek surgeons
Communist Party of Greece politicians
National Liberation Front (Greece) members
National and Kapodistrian University of Athens alumni
University of Bern alumni
Democratic Army of Greece personnel
Exiles of the Greek Civil War
Greek expatriates in East Germany
East German physicians
People from Livadeia
20th-century Greek physicians
Greek military personnel of World War II